Berit Marie Eira (born 6 March 1968) is a Norwegian Sami reindeer owner and politician who works in Kautokeino municipality. She represents the "Reindeer herder's list" party.

Biography
Berit Marie Persdtr Eira was born 6 March 1968. She studied commerce and economics, receiving a 3-year bachelor's degree in reindeer husbandry.

In 2014, Eira highlighted her opposition to the Norwegian government's reindeer husbandry policy, as she refused to accept the demand to reduce the herd flock despite the state's threats of coercive fines.

In 2017, as the first representative from the Flyttsamelista, she became a member of the Sámi Parliament of Norway. This happened after the Sami election, when the four parties of the Norwegian Sámi Association, the Center Party, Åarjel-Saemiej Gielh, and the Flyttsamelista joined forces to create a 'majority government'. According to the agreement, Eira is in the council for the first two years of the parliamentary term, and Ellinor Jåma of Åarjel-Saemiej Gielh for the last two.

See also
 Keskitalo's Third Council

References

External links
 Berit Marie P.E. Eira at Sametinget

1968 births
Living people
Members of the Sámi Parliament of Norway
Norwegian Sámi politicians
21st-century Norwegian women politicians
21st-century Norwegian politicians
People from Kautokeino